Richland Township is an inactive township in Gasconade County, in the U.S. state of Missouri.

Richland Township was established in 1846, and named for the richness of their soil.

References

Townships in Missouri
Townships in Gasconade County, Missouri